Mill Branch is a stream in Vernon County in the U.S. state of Missouri.

Mill Branch was so named on account of a mill pond near its course.

See also
List of rivers of Missouri

References

Rivers of Vernon County, Missouri
Rivers of Missouri